The Cana Brava River is a river of Tocantins & Goiás states in central Brazil. It is a tributary of the Santa Tereza River.

See also
List of rivers of Tocantins

References
Brazilian Ministry of Transport

Rivers of Tocantins